Mun Yang-ja (born 20 April 1956) is a South Korean sports shooter. She competed in the women's 25 metre pistol event at the 1984 Summer Olympics.

References

1956 births
Living people
South Korean female sport shooters
Olympic shooters of South Korea
Shooters at the 1984 Summer Olympics
Place of birth missing (living people)